Boodles or Boodle's may refer to:

 Boodles (company), a British, luxury jewellery company
 Boodle's, a gentlemen's club in St. James's Street, London
 Boodles British Gin
 Boodles Challenge, an annual tennis tournament in England
 Boodles Boxing Ball, an annual society ball in London, England.
 Boodle (dog), poodle crossbreed

See also
 Boodle